6-way or Six Way may refer to:

Symmetric multiprocessing
Six Way, Alabama